Stewartstown railway station served Stewartstown in  County Tyrone in Northern Ireland.

The Great Northern Railway opened the station on 28 July 1879.

It closed on 16 January 1956.

Routes

References

Disused railway stations in County Tyrone
Railway stations opened in 1879
Railway stations closed in 1956
Railway stations in Northern Ireland opened in the 19th century